Pterostylis excelsa, commonly known as the tall rustyhood, or dry land green-hood is a flowering plant in the orchid family Orchidaceae and is endemic to South Australia. It has a rosette of leaves and when flowering, up to twenty green or brown flowers which lean forward and have a thick, fleshy, partly hairy, insect-like labellum.

Description
Pterostylis excelsa, is a terrestrial,  perennial, deciduous, herb with an underground tuber. Flowering plants have a rosette at the base of the flowering spike but the leaves are usually withered by flowering time. The flowers lean forward and there are between three and eight stem leaves wrapped around the flowering spike. Flowering occurs from August to December.

Taxonomy and naming
Pterostylis excelsa was first formally described in 1986 by Mark Clements from a specimen grown in the Australian National Botanic Gardens from a tuber collected from the Eyre Peninsula. The description was published in the fourth edition of the Flora of South Australia. The specific epithet (excelsa) is a Latin word meaning "high", "lofty" or "distinguished".

In 1941, William Nicholls described Pterostylis squamata var. valida and in 1994, David Jones raised it to species status as Pterostylis valida. However, this name is regarded as a synonym of Pterostylis excelsa.

Distribution and habitat
The tall rustyhood is widespread and locally common in the south-east of South Australia, sometimes growing in large colonies.

References

excelsa
Endemic orchids of Australia
Orchids of South Australia
Plants described in 1986